Goran Mujanović (born 29 September 1983) is a Croatian retired football midfielder who was last registered with Trnje Trnovec, but did not play any games there. He can also play as attacker-forward.

Club career
In the 2008–09 season, with NK Varteks, he was the club's top scorer in the top level Prva HNL. He signed for Slaven Belupo in 2010.

He joined Varaždin in August 2016 after a spell in Malta.

References

External links
 

1983 births
Living people
Sportspeople from Varaždin
Association football midfielders
Croatian footballers
Croatia youth international footballers
Croatia under-21 international footballers
NK Varaždin players
NK Pomorac 1921 players
Lierse S.K. players
NK Slaven Belupo players
HNK Rijeka players
Al-Nasr SC (Kuwait) players
Birkirkara F.C. players
NK Varaždin (2012) players
Croatian Football League players
Belgian Pro League players
Kuwait Premier League players
Maltese Premier League players
Croatian expatriate footballers
Expatriate footballers in Belgium
Croatian expatriate sportspeople in Belgium
Expatriate footballers in Kuwait
Croatian expatriate sportspeople in Kuwait
Expatriate footballers in Malta
Croatian expatriate sportspeople in Malta